The John Rogers House is an historic house located at 627 Half Hollow Road in Dix Hills, New York. It was built in 1732 by John Rogers in the Federal style.

On September 26, 1985, it was added to the National Register of Historic Places.

See also
 Rogers House (Huntington, New York) for the house at 136 Spring Road in Huntington, which was also added to the National Register of Historic Places on the same date.

References

Houses on the National Register of Historic Places in New York (state)
Houses in Suffolk County, New York
National Register of Historic Places in Suffolk County, New York
Houses completed in 1732